The 1906 Iowa State Senate elections took place as part of the biennial 1906 United States elections. Iowa voters elected state senators in 22 of the state senate's 50 districts. State senators serve four-year terms in the Iowa State Senate.

A statewide map of the 50 state Senate districts in the 1906 elections is provided by the Iowa General Assembly here.

The 1906 elections were the last in Iowa before primary elections were established by the Primary Election Law in 1907. The general election took place on November 6, 1906.

Following the previous election, Republicans had control of the Iowa Senate with 42 seats to Democrats' 8 seats.

To claim control of the chamber from Republicans, the Democrats needed to net 18 Senate seats.

Republicans maintained control of the Iowa State Senate following the 1906 general election with the balance of power shifting to Republicans holding 36 seats and Democrats having 14 seats (a net gain of 6 seats for Democrats).

Summary of Results
Note: The 28 holdover Senators not up for re-election are not listed on this table.

Source:

Detailed Results
NOTE: The 28 districts that did not hold elections in 1906 are not listed here.

District 1

District 4
To fill vacancy caused by resignation of R. A. Hasselquist, who was elected for full term in 1903.

District 7

District 9

District 10

District 12

District 13

District 18

District 20

District 21

District 22

District 29

District 30

District 34

District 35

District 37

District 38

District 42

District 44

District 45

District 48

District 50

See also
 United States elections, 1906
 United States House of Representatives elections in Iowa, 1906
 Elections in Iowa

References

1906 Iowa elections
Iowa
Iowa Senate elections